The Dorr Rebellion (1841–1842) (also referred to as Dorr's Rebellion, Dorr's War or Dorr War) was an attempt by disenfranchised residents to force broader democracy in the U.S. state of Rhode Island, where a small rural elite was in control of government. It was led by Thomas Wilson Dorr, who mobilized the disenfranchised to demand changes to the state's electoral rules. The state was still using its 1663 colonial charter as a constitution; it required that voters own land as qualification to vote. The rebellion established a parallel government alongside the existing chartered government and wrote a new constitution for Rhode Island. Although the rebellion was crushed militarily, it forced the rewriting of the state constitution to expand eligibility to vote.

Precursors and causes 
Under Rhode Island's colonial charter, originally received in 1663, only male landowners could vote. At the time, most of the citizens of the colonies were farmers and held land, and this qualification was considered fairly democratic. By the 1840s, the state required landed property worth at least $134, or ownership of land generating annual rent of at least $7, in order to vote.

As the Industrial Revolution reached North America and many people left the farms for the cities, large numbers of people could no longer meet the minimum property requirement to vote. By 1829, 60% of the state's free white men were ineligible to vote (women and most non-white men were prohibited from voting). Many of the disenfranchised were recent Irish Catholic immigrants or other Roman Catholics who lived and worked in the cities at salaried jobs.

Reformers favoring universal male suffrage argued that an electorate made up of only 40% of the state's white men, and based on a colonial charter signed by the British monarch, was un-republican and thus violated the United States Constitution's Guarantee Clause, Art. IV: Sec. 4 ("The United States shall guarantee to every State in this Union a Republican Form of Government [...]").

Before the 1840s, activists made several attempts to replace the colonial charter with a new state constitution that provided broader voting rights, but all failed. The state lacked a procedure to amend the Charter. The Rhode Island General Assembly, dominated by rural landowners, had consistently failed to liberalize the constitution by extending the franchise, enacting a bill of rights, or reapportioning the legislature based on demographic changes as the cities acquired much larger populations. By 1841, most states of the United States had removed property requirements and other restrictions on voting (see Jacksonian democracy). Rhode Island was nearly the only state falling significantly short of universal white manhood suffrage.

Rebellion 
In 1841, suffrage supporters led by Dorr gave up on attempts to change the system from within. In October, they held an extralegal People's Convention and drafted a new constitution, known as the People's Constitution, which granted the vote to all white men with one year's residence. Dorr had originally supported granting voting rights to Blacks, but he changed his position in 1840 because of pressure from white immigrants, who wanted to gain the vote first. At the same time, the state's General Assembly formed a rival convention and drafted the Freemen's Constitution, with some concessions to democratic demands.

Late in that year, the two constitutions were voted on, and the Freemen's Constitution was defeated in the legislature, largely by Dorr supporters, while the People's Convention version was overwhelmingly supported in a referendum in December. Much of the support for the People's Convention constitution was from the newly eligible voters, but Dorr claimed that most of those eligible under the old constitution had also supported it, making it legal.

In early 1842, both groups organized elections of their own, leading in April to the selections of both Dorr and Samuel Ward King as Governor of Rhode Island. King showed no signs of introducing the new constitution; when matters came to a head, he declared martial law. On May 4, the state legislature requested the dispatch of federal troops to suppress the "lawless assemblages". President John Tyler sent an observer, then decided not to send soldiers because "the danger of domestic violence is hourly diminishing". Nevertheless, Tyler cited the U.S. Constitution and added that

If resistance is made to the execution of the laws of Rhode-Island, by such force as the civil peace shall be unable to overcome, it will be the duty of this Government to enforce the constitutional guarantee—a guarantee given and adopted mutually by all the original States.

Most of the state militiamen were Irishmen newly enfranchised by the Dorr referendum; they supported him. The Irish who played a growing role in Democratic politics in other states, such as Tammany Hall in New York City, gave Dorr their verbal support, but sent no money or men to help.

The "Dorrites" led an unsuccessful attack against the arsenal in Providence, Rhode Island on May 19, 1842. Defenders of the arsenal on the "Charterite" side (those who supported the original charter) included Dorr's father Sullivan Dorr and his uncle Crawford Allen. At the time, these men owned the Bernon Mill Village in Woonsocket, Rhode Island. In addition, among the defenders of Providence were many Black men who had supported Dorr before he dropped them from his call for suffrage. Dorr's cannon failed to fire, no one was hurt, and his army retreated in disarray.

After his defeat, Dorr fled to New York and returned in late June 1842 with armed supporters and assembled his forces on Acote's Hill in Chepachet, where they hoped to reconvene the People's Convention. Governor King called out the state militia which marched on Chepachet to engage the Dorrite forces.

Charterite forces were sent to Woonsocket to defend the village and to cut off the Dorrite forces' retreat. The Charterites fortified a house in preparation for an attack, but it never came.

Dorr disbanded his forces, realizing that he would be defeated in battle by the approaching militia, and fled the state. Governor King issued a warrant for Dorr's arrest with a reward of $5,000.

Aftermath 
The Charterites were finally convinced of the strength of the suffrage cause and called another convention. In September 1842, a session of the Rhode Island General Assembly met at Newport, Rhode Island and framed a new state constitution, which was ratified by the old, limited electorate, was proclaimed by Governor King on January 23, 1843, and took effect in May. The new constitution greatly liberalized voting requirements by extending suffrage to any native born adult male, regardless of race, who could pay a poll tax of $1, which would go to support public schools in the state. The constitution retained the property requirement for non-native born citizens and prohibited members of the Narragansett Indian Tribe from voting.

In the next Presidential election held after the Dorr Rebellion in 1844, 12,296 votes were cast, a significant increase from the 8,621 cast in 1840.

In Luther v. Borden (1849), the Supreme Court of the United States held that the constitutional right to change governments was unquestioned, but that the Supreme Court did not have the authority to interfere because the Constitutional guarantee of a "republican form of government" was a political question best left to the other branches of the federal government.

Dorr's fate 

Dorr returned in 1843, was found guilty of treason against the state, and was sentenced in 1844 to solitary confinement and hard labor for life. The harshness of the sentence was widely condemned, and Dorr was released in 1845, his health now broken. His civil rights were restored in 1851. In 1854, the court judgment against him was set aside. He died later that year.

Interpretations
Historians have long debated the meaning and nature of the rebellion.

Mowry (1901) portrayed the Dorrites as irresponsible idealists who ignored the state's need for stability and order. Gettleman (1973) hailed it as an early working-class attempt to overthrow an elitist government. Dennison (1976) saw it as a legitimate expression of Republicanism in the United States, but concluded that politics changed little for Rhode Islanders after 1842 because the same elite groups ruled the state.

However, in 1854, the Rhode Island Supreme Court wrote: "The union of all the powers of government in the same hands is but the definition of despotism". Thus, the same Court that convicted Dorr of treason against the charter in 1844 ruled ten years later that the charter had improperly authorized a despotic, non-republican, un-American form of government. Coleman (1963) explored the complex coalition that supported Dorr, with the changing economic structure of the state in mind, noting that the middle classes, the poor farmers, and the industrialists mostly peeled off after the 1843 Constitution gave in to their demands. The factory workers remained but were too few and too poorly organized to do much. He finds Seth Luther to be one of the few stalwarts from the working class.

The timidity of the Dorrites in 1842, Coleman concludes, was a reflection of their fragile coalition. Looking at Dorr himself, Coleman (1976) argued: "At several crucial moments the suffragists were offered, but rejected, every reform they asked for. Indeed, the constitution they were offered even went beyond their demands. But Dorr would have no part of it; the process of formulation was flawed. It did not conform to his concept of popular sovereignty. Compromise was out of the question. Principle became all. Dorr hungered for the vindication of principle. He was determined to lead his supporters into martyrdom."

See also
Alfred Niger
List of incidents of civil unrest in the United States
Luther v. Borden

References

Endnotes

Bibliography
 Chaput, Erik J. The People's Martyr: Thomas Wilson Dorr and His 1842 Rhode Island Rebellion (2013).
 Chaput, Erik J. "'Let the people remember!': Rhode island's Dorr rebellion and bay state politics, 1842-1843." Historical Journal of Massachusetts 39#1-2 (2011), pp. 108+. online
 Chaput, Erik J. "Proslavery and Antislavery Politics in Rhode Island's 1842 Dorr Rebellion," New England Quarterly (2012) 85#4 pp 658–694 doi:10.1162/TNEQ_a_00231
 Chaput, Erik J. "'The Rhode Island Question': The Career of a Debate," Rhode Island History (2010) 68#2 pp 46–76.
 Chaput, Erik J. "The 'Rhode Island Question' on Trial: The 1844 Treason Trial of Thomas Dorr," American Nineteenth Century History (2010) 11#2 pp 205–232.
 Coleman, Peter J. The Transformation of Rhode Island, 1790–1860 (1963), covers economic issues
 Coleman, Peter J. "The Dorr War And The Emergence Of The Leviathan State," Reviews in American History (1976) 4#4 pp 533–538. reviews Dennison (1976)
  Conley, Patrick T. "Popular Sovereignty or Public Anarchy? American Debates the Dorr Rebellion," Rhode Island History (2002) 60#3 pp 71–91.
 Dennison; George M. The Dorr War: Republicanism on Trial, 1831–1861 (1976) online
 Fritz, Christian G. American Sovereigns: The People and America's Constitutional Tradition Before the Civil War (2009), 
 
 Hiles, Jonathan. "The Dorr Rebellion and the Social Contract of Political Equality," Rhode Island History (2012) 70#2 pp 47–73
 Mowry, Arthur May. The Dorr War; or, The Constitutional Struggle in Rhode Island (1901; reprinted 1970); sees the Dorrites as irresponsible idealists who ignored the state's need for stability and order
 Williamson, Chilton. American Suffrage: From Property to Democracy, 1760–1860 (1960),

Primary sources
 Frances Harriet Whipple Green McDougall, Might and Right by a Rhode Islander (1844), based on information supplied by Dorr

External links
 Providence College and Phillips Memorial Library's documentary and gallery of images on the Dorr Rebellion
 Woonsocket.org: Dorr War
 RhodeIslandSuffrage.org: The Industrial Revolution & Dorr's Rebellion
 Strange Bedfellows: The Politics of Race in Antebellum Rhode Island 

 
1840s in the United States
19th-century rebellions
Conflicts in 1841
Conflicts in 1842
History of Rhode Island
History of voting rights in the United States
Politics of Rhode Island
Rebellions in the United States
1841 in Rhode Island
1842 in Rhode Island
Irish-American history
Rhode Island General Assembly
Battles and conflicts without fatalities